Brown v. Socialist Workers '74 Campaign Committee, 459 U.S. 87 (1982), was a United States Supreme Court case that dealt with political speech, and whether a state could require a minor political party to disclose its membership, expenditures, and contributors.

At the time, most states required political parties to disclose their contributions and expenditures; in 1982, the Court ruled that the Socialist Workers Party, a minor party in Ohio, was not required to disclose its contributors or recipients, on the basis of retributive animus and harassment if party functionaries did so.

References

External links 

United States Supreme Court cases
United States Supreme Court cases of the Burger Court
1982 in United States case law
Socialist Workers Party (United States)